The Hawk in Hi Fi is an album by saxophonist Coleman Hawkins with an orchestra arranged and conducted by Billy Byers. It was recorded in early 1956 and released on the RCA Victor label.

Reception

Scott Yanow of AllMusic states: "Hawkins is the main soloist throughout, and he was still very much in his prime 33 years after he first joined Fletcher Henderson's orchestra; in fact, the upcoming year of 1957 would be one of his finest. However, Byers' arrangements are more functional than inspired, and some of these selections are more easy listening than they are swinging".

On PopMatters, Matt Cibula noted "Every song here is pretty amazing. Byers’ arrangements are like simple rings on which Hawkins’ solos are beautiful diamonds. It might get a little soupy at times but there is nothing sentimental about any of these tracks, and there is real wit and verve and intelligence behind every choice here. And when they swing, they swing it hard. 'I Never Knew' rocks along very nicely, as do a couple more Hawkins originals; 'His Very Own Blues' and a new version of 'Bean and the Boys' entitled '39"-25"-39"' must have set many a late-‘50s dancefloor on fire. The alternate takes are not revelatory—they sound a whole lot like the finished versions, with the solos maybe not quite as sharp".

Track listing
All compositions by Coleman Hawkins except where noted
 "Body and Soul" (Johnny Green, Frank Eyton, Edward Heyman, Robert Sour) – 5:00
 "Little Girl Blue" [Take 3] (Richard Rodgers, Lorenz Hart) – 3:04
 "I Never Knew" [Take 5] (Raymond B. Egan, Roy Marsh, Tom Pitts) – 3:07
 "Dinner for One Please, James" [Take 3] (Michael Carr) – 3:12
 "The Bean Stalks Again" – 3:25
 "His Very Own Blues" – 3:03
 "The Day You Came Along" (Arthur Johnston, Sam Coslow) – 4:10
 "Have You Met Miss Jones?" [Take 7] (Rodgers, Hart) – 3:06
 "The Essence of You" – 3:30
 "There Will Never Be Another You" (Harry Warren, Mack Gordon) – 3:00
 "I'm Shooting High" (Jimmy McHugh, Ted Koehler) – 2:36
 "39-25-39" [AKA "Bean and the Boys"] – 2:52
 "There Will Never Be Another You" [Alternate Take I] (Warren, Gordon) – 3:23 Additional track on CD release
 "There Will Never Be Another You" [Alternate Take II] (Warren, Gordon) – 3:26 Additional track on CD release
 "Little Girl Blue" [Take 1] (Rodgers, Hart) – 3:09 Additional track on CD release
 "Dinner for One Please, James" [Take 2] (Rodgers, Hart) – 3:17 Additional track on CD release
 "I Never Knew" [Take 2] (Egan, Marsh, Pitts) – 3:18 Additional track on CD release
 "Have You Met Miss Jones?" [Take 1] (Rodgers, Hart) – 3:10 Additional track on CD release
 "Have You Met Miss Jones?" [Alternate Take I] (Rodgers, Hart) – 3:20 Additional track on CD release
 "Have You Met Miss Jones?" [Alternate Take II] (Rodgers, Hart) – 2:38 Additional track on CD release
 "The Day You Came Along" [Alternate Take] (Johnston, Coslow) – 3:15 Additional track on CD release

Personnel

Coleman Hawkins – tenor saxophone
Billy Byers – arranged and conducted
Bernie Glow  (tracks 5-6 & 11-12), Jimmy Nottingham (tracks 2-4, 10 & 13-17), Lou Oles (tracks 5-6 & 11-12), Ernie Royal (tracks 5-6 & 11-12), Charlie Shavers (tracks 5-6 & 11-12), Nick Travis (tracks 5-6 & 11-12) – trumpet
Urbie Green (tracks 2-6 & 10-17),  Tommy Mitchell (tracks: 2-4, 10 & 13-17), Fred Ohms (tracks 2-6 & 10-17), Jack Satterfield (tracks 2-6 & 10-17), Chauncey Welsch (tracks 5-6, 11 & 12) – trombone
Jimmy Buffington – French horn (tracks 1, 7-9 & 18-21)
Don Butterfield – tuba (tracks 2-4, 10 & 13-17)
Julius Baker – flute (tracks 1-4, 7-10 & 13-21)
Sid Jekowsky – clarinet, flute (tracks 1-4, 7-10 & 13-21)
Phil Bodner – oboe (tracks 1-4, 7-10 & 13-21)
Sam Marowitz (tracks 5-6 & 11-12), Hal McKusick (tracks 5-6 & 11-12) – alto saxophone
Al Cohn (tracks 5-6 & 11-12), Zoot Sims (tracks 5-6 & 11-12) – tenor saxophone
Sol Schlinger – baritone saxophone (tracks 5-6 & 11-12)
Marty Wilson – vibraphone, xylophone, glockenspiel
Hank Jones – piano, celesta
Barry Galbraith – guitar (tracks 5-6 & 11-12)
Milt Hinton (tracks 5-6 & 11-12), Jack Lesberg (tracks 1, 7-9 & 18-21) – bass
Osie Johnson – drums
Phil Kraus – bells (tracks 1, 7-9 & 18-21)
Alvin Rudnitsky, Arnold Eidus, Dave Newman, Dave Sarser, Gene Orloff, Harry Lookofsky, Leo Kruczek, Max Cahn, Max Hollander, Paul Gershman, Stan Kraft, Cy Miroff, Tosha Samaroff – violin
Bert Fisch (tracks 1, 7-9 & 18-21), Izzy Zir (tracks 2-4, 10 & 13-17) – viola
Alan Schulman (tracks: 2-4, 10 & 13-17), Bernie Greenhouse (tracks 1, 7-9 & 18-21), Eduardo Sodero (tracks 1, 7-9 & 18-21), George Ricci (tracks 1, 7-9 & 18-21) – cello

References

Coleman Hawkins albums
1956 albums
RCA Records albums
Albums arranged by Billy Byers